Saatlı (also, Saatly) is a village and municipality in the Barda Rayon of Azerbaijan.  It has a population of 622.

Notable natives 

 Mirza Guliyev — National Hero of Azerbaijan.

References

Populated places in Barda District